Film was a Yugoslav rock group founded in 1978 in Zagreb. Film was one of the most popular rock groups of the former Yugoslav new wave in the late 1970s to early 1980s.

History

New wave years (1979-1981) 
During 1977 and 1978, bassist Marino Pelajić, guitarist Mladen Jurčić, and drummer Branko Hromatko were Azra members when Branimir "Johnny" Štulić brought Jura Stublić as the new vocalist. Stublić was to become Aerodrom member, but due to his deep vocals it never happened. The lineup functioned for a few months only and after a quarrel with Štulić, on early 1979, Pelajić, Jurčić, Hromatko and Stublić formed the band Šporko Šalaporko i Negove Žaluzine, naming the band after a story from the "Polet" youth magazine, which was soon after renamed to Film. The memories of the Azra lineup later inspired Štulić to write the song "Roll over Jura" released on Filigranski pločnici in 1982.

Saxophonist Jurij Novoselić, who at the time had worked under the pseudonym Kuzma Videosex, joined the band, inspiring others to use pseudonym instead of their original names: vocalist Stublić became Jura Jupiter, bassist Pelajić became Mario Baraccuda and guitarist Jurčić became Max Wilson. Before joining the band, Stublić did not have much experience as a vocalist, however, since his father had been an opera singer, he often visited the theatre and opera, and at the age of 13, he started playing the guitar, earning money as a street performer at seaside resorts.

After their first live appearances they had quickly gained the respectable title "A first class new wave club attraction", and the first larger appearance was as an opening act for Lena Lovich on her 1980 Yugoslav tour. At the time, the band recorded their first single "Kad si mlad" ("When you're young") with "Zajedno" ("Together") as the B-side, which was released a year later due to the record label refusal to accept band idea of putting a screen-shot from the film Barbarella on the single cover. On the Festival Omladina, the band won with the song "Neprilagođen" ("Misfit"), after which they became one of the most popular bands in former Yugoslavia.

The 1981 debut album Novo! Novo! Još jučer samo na filmu a sada i u vašoj glavi (Extra! Extra! Since yesterday only on film and now in your head), featuring the new drummer Ivan Stančić "Piko", a former Grupa 220, Time and Parni Valjak member, who came as a replacement for Hromatko who had gone to serve the Yugoslav People's Army. The album, produced by Buldožer member Boris Bele, featuring a series of urban ska sound with a clear message: "Neprilagođen" ("Misfit"), "Zamisli" ("Imagine"), "Moderna djevojka" ("Modern girl"), "Radio ljubav" ("Radio love") and "Odvedi me iz ovog grada" ("Take me out of this town"). Stublić was signed as the author of the complete material, being inspired by the life in and around Zagreb.

In January 1981, the band triumphed at the Pozdrav iz Zagreba (Greetings from Zagreb) festival. At the time as live musician appeared the rock critic Dražen Vrdoljak on organ, with whom the band performed at the 1981 Festival Omladina as the winners of the previous festival, causing quite a spectacle with the audience massively occupying the stage. The energy of their live appearances were captured live on the EP Film u Kulušiću – Live (Film in Kulušić - Live), recorded in the Zagreb club Kulušić on February 11, 1981. The EP, the first of the many following live releases recorded in the same club, featured a witty band introduction by Vrdoljak, and live versions of six tracks originally released on the first album.

After the EP release, the band went on an Adriatic coast tour with the Belgrade new wave band Idoli, with whom the band became close after the 1980 Festival Omladina on which the two bands had performed. At the time, the Jugoton rereleased Film u Kulušiću – Live and VIS Idoli EP as a split compilation Zajedno (Together).

Mainstream rock years (1982-1986) 
On late 1981, after a quarrel between Stublić and the rest of the band on the new studio album conception, the band went on a two-month work break. Having agreed on the future of their work, the band recorded the second studio album Zona sumraka (Twilight zone), released in 1981, offering a more depressive view on of live, covering loneliness, alienation in city life, crime and drug addiction problems. Successful with the songs "Zagreb je hladan grad" ("Zagreb is a cold town") and "Krvariš oko ponoći" ("You're bleeding around midnight"), the album featured two instrumental tracks, "Džems Bond" ("James Bond"), a cover of the theme from the film serial of the same name, and "España" ("Spain"). As authors on the album, beside Stublić, appeared Jurčić, Stančić and Novoselić.

For the recording of the third studio album, the band went to Sweden where, produced by Tihomir "Tini" Varga, the band recorded Sva čuda svijeta (All the wonders of the world), featuring the hit songs "Kada budu gorijeli gradovi" ("When the cities would burn"), "Istina piše na zidu" ("The truth is written on the wall"), "Mi nismo sami" ("We are not alone"), "Boje su u nama" ("The colors are inside us"), and the title track. Due to the Pelajić departure to the army, Jurčić recorded the bass parts, and after the album release, Jurčić went to the army being temporarily replaced by the former Drugi Način member Robert Krkač on the promotional tour. The song "Mi nismo sami" was soon after covered by a Swedish rock group as "Have you ever".

The following album, Signali u noći, the band recorded with the drummer Dražen Šolc, the returned Pelajić and Jurčić, and as the album producer was chosen the English musician and producer Nick Van Eede. The album brought the concert favorites "Pjevajmo do zore" ("Let's sing until dawn"), "Rijeke pravde" ("Rivers of justice"), "Osmijesi" ("Smiles"), and the title track. Guests on the album included Massimo Savić on guitar and backing vocals, Davor Slamnig on guitar, Ljerka Šimara on harp, and Nikola Santro on trombone.

At the time, Juričić, Pelajić and Stančić formed the band Le Cinema, performing cover versions of the foreign new wave hits, expressing their musical differences to the ones Stublić had, which lead the band to part ways in the Spring of 1986. The three remained in Le Cinema, Juričić also formed Vještice with the former Azra drummer Boris Leiner, eventually ending up in the band Šo! Mazgoon. Pelajić joined Haustor and appeared on their album Tajni grad in 1988. Novoselić formed his band Dee Dee Mellow, was a member of Disciplina Kičme and finally joined Psihomodo Pop.

Reunion (1998) 
During mid-1998, the default Film lineup Juričić, Pelajić and Stančić reunited with Stublić for a one-off show and performed at the Zagreb Gori (Zagreb's Burning) open-air concert.

Reunion (2018) 
The band reformed and played events such as the Dubrovnik Craft Beer Festival in 2018.

Post-breakup

Jura Stublić & Film 
In 1987, Stublić, as Jura Stublić & Film, released the studio album Sunce sja (The sun is shining), with Robert Krkač (guitar), Dario Kumerle (bass), Željko Turčinović (drums) and Bojan Goričan (keyboards), and as guest vocalist appeared Jurica Pađen and Massimo Savić. Focusing on the pop rock sound, Stublić recorded "Srce na cesti" ("Heart on the road"), "Ivana" ("Ivana"), "Dom" ("Home"), and "Valovi ('67.-'77.-'87.)" ("Waves ('67-77-87) and "Sjećam se prvog poljupca" ("I remember the first kiss").

The following release, the 1989 studio album Zemlja sreće (The land of Happiness), featured the new guitarist Deni Kožić and drummer Davor Vidiš, and as guests on the album appeared Laza Ristovski, Vlatko Stefanovski, Massimo Savić, guitarist Branko Bogunović, Davor Rodik and klapa "Bonaca". The album featured "Dobre vibracije" (Good Vibrations), "Doći ću ti u snovima" ("I'll come to your dreams"), "Ljubav je zakon" ("Love is the law"), and "Uhvati vjetar" ("Catch the Wind"), a cover of Silute version of a Donovan song. During the same year, the band also appeared on the double various artists live album ZG forces live, released by Jugoton, also featuring the most prominent Zagreb bands at the time Psihomodo Pop, Parni Valjak and Prljavo Kazalište, each covering one LP side on the release.

During the early 1990s, Stublić often changed the band members and in 1992, he released Hrana za golubove, featuring the song "E moj druže beogradski" ("Oh my Belgrade friend"), succumbed to Yugoslav wars which were fought in the time of the album release. The song was recorded as a cover version of the song "Na morskome plavom žalu" ("On the blue sea strand"), originally recorded by Dragan Jokić for the Emir Kusturica film Do You Remember Dolly Bell?, with the new lyrics. The lineup which recorded the album, beside Stublić featured Mario Zidar (guitar), Ante Pecotić (bass) and Goran Rakočević (drums).

In 1994 appeared the first compilation album Greatest hits vol. 1, featuring two new songs, "Nježno, nježno, nježnije" ("Gentle, gentle, gentler") and the cynical "Čikago" ("Chicago"), a cover version of the old work action song "U tunelu usred mraka" ("In the tunnel in the dark"). The recording of the song was in possession of the record label for six months, eventually being released without a line from the lyrics, but despite the fact, the song was banned on the Croatian media. The followup was the second part of the compilation  Greatest hits vol. 2, released in 1996, featuring the rerecorded "Neprilagođen", "Moderna djevojka" and "Boje su u nama", and the new track "Lijepo, lijepo, neopisivo" ("Beautiful, beautiful, inexplicable")

In 2002, Stublić released another selection of the released material on the compilation album Sve najbolje (All the best).

Le Cinema 
The supergroup Le Cinema (Film in French language) was formed in December 1985 by the remaining members of the Film last lineup excluding Jura Stublić, Mladen Juričić "Max", Marino Pelajić "Baraccuda" and Ivan Stančić "Piko". The band, mainly performing the new wave and punk rock standards, quickly became a club attraction. With the band often appeared Mira Furlan, Massimo Savić, Vlada Divljan and Drago Mlinarec with whom the band recorded a cover version of the Mlinarec's Grupa 220 hit single "Osmijeh" ("Smile").

The band released the album Rocking At The Party Live!, recorded live in Kulušić on early 1988, offered the band's interpretation of the famous songs by John Lennon, Chuck Berry, Talking Heads, The Ramones, Blondie and others. The album also featured the song "Maršal" ("Marshall"), originally released as "Poslednji dani" ("The last days") by Idoli on their debut album Odbrana i poslednji dani (The defense and the last days), featuring Vlada Divljan, and the band introduction by Dražen Vrdoljak. After the album release, the band performed over two hundred concerts on the territory of the former Yugoslavia.

After taking a longer work break, the band renewed their activities in 1997, featuring the new bassist Žan Jankopač from the band Šo! Mazgoon, the band where Juričić had played. Despite the lineup changes, the original lineup recorded the comeback album Doručak kod Trulog (Breakfast at Rotten's), featuring nine cover versions of old Film songs, including "Zona sumraka" ("Twilight zone") with Majke vocalist Goran Bare on lead vocals, and cover of Šarlo Akrobata single "Ona se budi" ("She is waking up"), recorded live in the Zagreb KSET on October 12, 2002. The disc also featured a remastered material from the Rocking At The Party Live!, and music videos including the one recorded for the song "Osmijeh" with Drago Mlinarec.

On February 22, 2003, the band appeared on the Jako dobar tattoo Milan Mladenović tribute concert, held at the Zagreb Tvornica, which was recorded and released by CBS during the same year. The band covered the song "Krug" ("The Circle"), originally recorded by Ekatarina Velika on their 1989 album Samo par godina za nas.

Legacy
The book YU 100: najbolji albumi jugoslovenske rok i pop muzike (YU 100: The Best albums of Yugoslav pop and rock music) features four Film albums: Još jučer samo na filmu a sada i u vašoj glavi (ranked No. 22), Signali u noći (ranked No. 67), Sva čuda svijeta (ranked No. 69) and Film u Kulušiću – Live (ranked No. 70). The B92 Top 100 Domestic Songs list features three songs by Film: "Zamisli život u ritmu muzike za ples" (ranked No. 27), "Neprilagođen" (ranked No. 80) and "Boje su u nama" (ranked No. 85).

Discography

Film

Studio albums 
 Još jučer samo na filmu a sada i u vašoj glavi (1981)
 Zona sumraka (1982)
 Sva čuda svijeta (1983)
 Signali u noći (1985)

Extended plays 
 Film u Kulušiću – Live (1981)

Singles 
 "Kad si mlad" (1980)
 "Zamisli život u ritmu muzike za ples" (1981)
 "Zona sumraka" (1982)
 "Pljačka stoljeća" (1982)
 "Ti zračiš zrake" (1983)
 "Boje su u nama" (1983)

Jura Stublić & Film

Studio albums 
 Sunce sja (1987)
 Zemlja sreće (1989)
 Hrana za golubove (1992)

Compilation albums 
 Greatest hits vol. 1 (1994)
 Greatest hits vol. 2 (1996)
 Sve najbolje (2001)

Le Cinema

Live albums 
 Rocking At The Party Live! (1989)

Studio albums 
 Doručak kod Trulog (2002)

Singles 
 "Krug" (2003)

See also 
 SFR Yugoslav pop and rock scene
 New wave music in Yugoslavia
 Music of Croatia
 Sretno dijete

References 

 EX YU ROCK enciklopedija 1960-2006, Janjatović Petar; 

Croatian rock music groups
Croatian new wave musical groups
Yugoslav rock music groups
Musical groups established in 1978
Musicians from Zagreb